Megachile tulariana is a species of bee in the family Megachilidae. It was described by Mitchell in 1937.

References

Tulariana
Insects described in 1937